Tamayo is a surname. Notable people with the surname include:

Arnaldo Tamayo Méndez (born 1942), Cuban cosmonaut
Francisco Tamayo (1902-1985), Venezuelan botanist
Franz Tamayo (1878–1956), Bolivian intellectual
Gustavo Tamayo, Colombian ophthalmologist
Jeff Tamayo, pioneer of Taekwondo and military officer in the Philippines 
José Luis Tamayo (1858–1947), Ecuadorian president
Juan José Tamayo (born 1946), Spanish theologian
Manuel Tamayo y Baus (1829–1898), Spanish dramatist
María Fernanda Tamayo, Ecuadorian police official
Misael Tamayo Hernández (1952–2006), Mexican journalist
Rufino Tamayo (1899–1991), Mexican painter

Spanish-language surnames